The men's tournament in Volleyball at the 1980 Summer Olympics was the 5th edition of the event at the Summer Olympics, organized by the world's governing body, the FIVB in conjunction with the IOC. It was held in Moscow, Soviet Union from 20 July to 1 August 1980.

Qualification

* Tunisia and China withdrew because of the US-led boycott and were replaced by Libya and Czechoslovakia respectively.

Pools composition

Rosters

Venues

Preliminary round

Pool A

|}

|}

Pool B

|}

|}

Final round

9th–10th places

9th place match

|}

5th–8th places

5th–8th semifinals

|}

7th place match

|}

5th place match

|}

Final four

Semifinals

|}

Bronze medal match

|}

Gold medal match

|}

Final standing

Medalists

References

External links
Final Standing (1964–2000)
Results at Todor66.com
Results at Sports123.com

O
1980
Men's events at the 1980 Summer Olympics